Zhukov is the name of several inhabited localities in Russia.

Urban localities
Zhukov, Kaluga Oblast, a town in Zhukovsky District of Kaluga Oblast

Rural localities
Zhukov, Kursk Oblast, a khutor in Romanovsky Selsoviet of Khomutovsky District of Kursk Oblast
Zhukov, Rostov Oblast, a khutor in Zadono-Kagalnitskoye Rural Settlement of Semikarakorsky District of Rostov Oblast